Banaz is a town and district of Uşak Province in the inner Aegean region of Turkey. The mayor is Zafer Arpacı (AKP). Banaz district area neighbors those of two other districts of the same province, namely Sivaslı and Uşak central district from its south to its west, ranges three districts of Kütahya Province, Gediz, Altıntaş and Dumlupınar, along its north, and adjoins three districts of Afyonkarahisar Province, namely Sandıklı, Sinanpaşa and Hocalar to its east. 

The town has a population of 15,504 (2007 census). 

The district extends on a large and fertile plain (65 km²) that carries the same name as the town and the district (Banaz Plain - Banaz Ovası), and it is an area of intense and varied agricultural production, as well as of dense forestation. 

The stream that crosses and feeds the plain carries the name Banaz as well (Banaz Çayı) and it later joins Büyük Menderes River. Sugarbeet and opium are the principal agricultural products that are grown in Banaz. 

Another notable feature of the district is the presence of several hot thermal springs, some of which, such as those at localities called Evrendede, Çatalçam and Hamamboğazı have been arranged to serve as health centers with accommodation and as recreational areas. 

The district has two depending townships with their own municipality (Büyükoturak and Kızılcahöyük) and 45 villages. One of these villages, lying at a distance of 4 km from the district center carries the same name of "Banaz" and is where the ancient site of the locality, called Panasion and from which the name Banaz derives, was actually located.

References

 

Populated places in Uşak Province
Districts of Uşak Province
Towns in Turkey
Phrygia